La Coulotte Peak is located on the border of Alberta and British Columbia on the Continental Divide. It was named after La Coulotte in France.

See also
 List of peaks on the Alberta–British Columbia border
 Mountains of Alberta
 Mountains of British Columbia

References

La Coulotte Peak
La Coulotte Peak
Canadian Rockies